Kitaura may refer to:

Lake Kitaura, a lake in Japan
Kitaura, Ibaraki, a former town in Namegata District, Ibaraki Prefecture, Japan
Kitaura, Miyazaki, a former town in Higashiusuki District, Miyazaki Prefecture, Japan
Kitaura Station (disambiguation), multiple railway stations in Japan

People with the surname
, Japanese rower

Japanese-language surnames